Department of Textiles is government of the People's Republic of Bangladesh's state department under its ministry of textiles and jute which is responsible for the industrial revolution of textiles sector in the country. The function of the department is to act as guardian for this economic sector and to address to its need based demands.

History
The department was first established in 1978, as a subsidised agency of the Bangladeshi ministry of textiles and jute, following a parliamentary ordinance from Jatio Shongshod. Previous to the founding of the department, its responsibilities were handled by the Textile Wing of the country's ministry of industries.

References

1978 establishments in Bangladesh
Organisations based in Dhaka
Government agencies of Bangladesh
Government departments of Bangladesh